IVI or Ivi may refer to:

People 
 Ivi (footballer) (Iván López Álvarez, born 1994), Spanish footballer
 Ivi Adamou (born 1993), Greek Cypriot singer
 Ivi Eenmaa (born 1943), Estonian politician
 Ivi Kreen (born 1935), Estonian television presenter
 Ivi Monteiro (born 1984), Brazilian swimmer

Science and technology 

 Importance Value Index, measure of biodiversity
 Incremental Velocity Indicator, system to provide visual indications of incremental velocity for the longitudinal, lateral, and vertical axes of a spacecraft.
 Interchangeable Virtual Instrumentation, a set of standards for test and measurement instrument drivers.
 Ion vibration current, in physics
 IVI Translation, a stateless IPv4/IPv6 translation technique

Organizations 

 International Vaccine Institute, international vaccine research organization
 Ivi, Inc., American video streaming service
 Ivi.ru, Russian video streaming service

Other 

 In-vehicle infotainment,  a collection of hardware devices installed into automobiles to provide audio/visual entertainment